Clinton Moore (born 24 April 1988 in Bundaberg, Queensland) is a freestyle motocross rider from Australia. He is the current Red Bull X Fighters World Tour Champion winning the last event of the year in Abu Dhabi.

Personal life and career
Clinton Moore first started riding a dirt bike when he was a little kid, using the acres around the farm to develop his bike skills. This was when he realized he wanted to grow up to be a FMX rider. Moore originally got into the sport when his older sister's boyfriend lent him tapes of Freestyle Motocross riders.
Moore participated in X-Games 2010 in freestyle where he finished in fourth place. Moore also made his Red Bull X-Fighters debut that year in London where he finished in dead last at eighth place. In 2015 Moore made his first career win in Red Bull X Fighters where he won against Levi Sherwood 3-2 in the finals in Mexico City.

References 

 http://www.redbullxfighters.com/en_US/athlete/clinton-moore Retrieved 2015-05-27.
 http://rockstarenergy.com/actionsports/fmx/clinton-moore Retrieved 2015-05-27.
 https://web.archive.org/web/20150528015622/http://nitrocircus.com/riders/clinton-moore/ Retrieved 2015-05-27.

External links 
 
 

1988 births
Living people
Sportspeople from Bundaberg
Australian motocross riders
X Games athletes
Freestyle motocross riders